Thomas Lewis may refer to:

Sportsmen
Thomas Lewis (English cricketer) (died 1882), English cricketer
Thomas Lewis (Australian cricketer) (1829–1901), Australian cricketer
Thomas Lewis (American football) (born 1972), American football wide receiver

Politicians
Thomas Lewis (of Harpton) (1518/9–1607), British Member of Parliament for Radnorshire, 1559–1567 and 1584–1587
Thomas Lewis (Wells politician), 16th-century MP for Wells, Somerset
Thomas Lewis (died 1594), MP for Monmouth Boroughs
Thomas Lewis (died 1736) (c. 1679–1736), British Member of Parliament for Buckingham, Portsmouth, Salisbury and Winchester
Thomas Lewis (Welsh politician) (1821–1897), Liberal Member of Parliament for Anglesey
Thomas Lewis Jr. (1760–1847), U.S. Congressman from Virginia
Thomas Lewis (1690–1777), British Member of Parliament for Radnor, 1715–1761
Thomas Arthur Lewis (1881–1923), Welsh school teacher, barrister and Liberal Party politician
Thomas Lewis (Kentucky politician) (1749–1809), State Senator, prominent figure in the development of Kentucky
Thomas Lewis (1821–1897) (1821–1897), Welsh-born Australian politician
Thomas Lewis (Bristol politician) (1871–?), British trade unionist and politician
Thomas F. Lewis (1924–2003), former U.S. Congressman from Florida

Others
Thomas Lewis (activist) (1940–2007), artist and activist
Thomas Lewis (astronomer) (1856–1927), astronomer at the Greenwich Observatory
Thomas Lewis (footballer), Welsh international footballer in 1881
Thomas Lewis (unionist) (1866–1939), president of the United Mine Workers of America
Thomas Lewis (Virginia politician) (1718–1790), American surveyor, Virginia pioneer
Thomas Lewis (cardiologist) (1881–1945), British surgeon and cardiologist
Thomas Lewis (industrialist) (died 1764), cofounder of the Dowlais Ironworks in 1759
Thomas Frankland Lewis (1780–1855), British Poor Law Commissioner
Thomas Christopher Lewis (1833–1915), British organ-builder, see St Paul's Cathedral, Melbourne
Thomas Flo Lewis, inventor of the Bassa alphabet
Thomas Lewis (RAF officer) (1894–1961), World War I flying ace
Thomas Lewis (controversialist) (1689–?), English cleric
Thomas Lewis (organist) (died 1674), English organist

See also
Tom Lewis (disambiguation)
Tommy Lewis (disambiguation)
Thomas Louis (1758–1807), British Royal Naval officer
Lewis Thomas (1913–1993), American physician and author